Wanted is a 2011 Indian Telugu-language action film written and directed by directed by B.V.S.Ravi produced by V. Ananda Prasad on Bhavya Creations banner. It stars Gopichand and Deeksha Seth, alongside an ensemble supporting cast including Prakash Raj, Nassar, Chandra Mohan, Jayasudha, Brahmanandam, Subbaraju, Ali, Ahuti Prasad, Raghu Babu and Shafi. The music was composed by Chakri with cinematography by Rasool Ellore. The film released on 26 January 2011.

Plot
Ram Babu is the only son of a cute couple: Ram Babu and Janaki. The parents have earned so much for their son to lead a happy life without doing any work. In simple, Ram Babu is a vagabond with no work other than roaming on roads with his batch. All of a sudden, he meets Nandini, a house surgeon who saves Janaki's life when she had a severe heart attack. From the very next moment, Ram Babu falls in love with Nandini to chase her everywhere and make her accept his love, but she never reciprocates. A frustrated Ram Babu beats up goons when they tease Nandini and asks her what else he can do in order to win her love. Nandini shocks Ram Babu by asking him to kill local drug don Basava Reddy (and his family members to win her hand. With no logics, Ram Babu sets on the action scenes, but Nandini's flashback is revealed by the commissioner. Nandini is the daughter of an undercover cop named Raghunath, and her entire family is killed in the hands of Basava Reddy. Because of this, she is on a revenge spree, taking process and using Ram Babu as her weapon. How Ram Babu finished Nandini's task and how Nandini developed a bond of love in this process form rest of the story.

Cast

Soundtrack
The music is composed by Chakri and was released on Aditya Music. Wanted had its audio launch at Ramanaidu Studios. Prabhas had unveiled the first copy of the CD and presented it to actress Jayasudha.

Release
The film released on 26 January 2011. The film was later dubbed in Hindi as Jaanbaaz Ki Jung and in Tamil as Vengai Puli.

References

2011 films
2011 action drama films
Indian films about revenge
2010s Telugu-language films
2011 masala films
Indian action drama films
2011 directorial debut films
Films scored by Chakri